KDB Darussalam (06) is the lead ship of her class of offshore patrol vessels. The vessel is in active service in the Royal Brunei Navy (RBN).

OPV program 
The second batch of two ships were delivered by 2014.

Construction and career 
KDB Darussalam was built by Lürssen Werft company in Germany around the late 2000s. She is part of the first batch delivered from Germany to Brunei. Darussalam and  commissioned together on 4 May 2011 at Muara Naval Base. All four of her sister ships work in the offshore patrol vessel role.

RIMPAC 2014 

Both RBN ships participated in Exercise RIMPAC in 2014, hosted by the United States Third Fleet off Hawaii. The ships participated in the SINKEX exercise. Darussalam and Darulaman simultaneously fired their Exocet missiles, which struck the target which was the ex-USS Tuscaloosa.

Exercise Pelican 2015 
Singapore and Brunei concluded their flagship bilateral naval exercise on 27 November. Exercise Pelican ran from 23 to 27 November 2015, it was hosted by the Republic of Singapore Navy. The exercise featured RSS Valiant, Darussalam and Darulehsan.

SEAGULL 2016 
Darussalam participated in the ASEAN Defence Minister Meeting-Plus Maritime Security and Counter Terrorism Exercise, the SEAGULL 07/16 Exercise was officially inaugurated between the RBN and Philippine Navy.

The exercise integrated the ADMM-Plus ships to strengthen their capability and inter-operability in effectively addressing terrorism and maritime threats as they are put through realistic sea and land based scenarios. The effort from the ADMM-Plus ships showed their continuous commitment in enhancing regional peace and stability.

PASSEX 2018 

On 7 March 2018, the  made a goodwill visit to Muara Naval Base after sailing from Hong Kong.   On 9 March, Vendémiaire conducted a PASSEX with Darussalam, before sailing to the Philippines.

Exercise PELICAN 2019 
All Republic of Singapore Navy ships left on 7 November 2019.

Gallery

References 

Royal Brunei Navy
Ships of Brunei
2009 ships